Oxygen Express was a series of long-haul/short-haul train service jointly operated by Ministry of Railways and Indian Railways to overcome severe shortage of medical-grade oxygen by supplying to various hospitals in different parts of India and Bangladesh during the second-wave of COVID-19 pandemic in India.

Background 
Oxygen Express trains were operated in two formats; the first method is transporting by using cryogenic ISO tanks which can carry 16 metric-tonnes of liquid medical oxygen each. And, the second method is fixed tankers on semis such as Tata Motors 1618s; which are further loaded on to the trains at the roll-on/roll-off discharge facilities of Indian Railways and Indian Army.

During the peak of pandemic,the tarins ran on signal-free, green corridor routes; transporting oxygen from various steel plants to various part of the country.

In July 2021, 200 metric-tonnes of liquid medical oxygen transported to Benapole Border Crossing in Bangladesh, from Tatanagar Junction railway station.

Gallery

References 

Indian Railways trains
COVID-19 pandemic in India